Sombrio is a municipality in the state of Santa Catarina in the South region of Brazil.

Economy
In agriculture, the main products are rice, tobacco and banana. In industry, there are clothing, ceramics, furniture and footwear, and commerce, clothing stores, materials construction, appliance stores, among others.

Tourism
The city of Sombrio has as main tourist sights the Furnas, Morro da Moça,
Morro da Santa and the Calçadão Cultural. Its main festive dates are the city's
birthday, on December 30, Festa do Padroeiro on June 13, and Arraialfest, a large party held
every two years, usually in the last final of July week. For many years an explanation
has been sought for this name, which many do not like because of the sadness and
discouragement that the same erroneously seems to contain. In the present case the name connects to the word shadow, remembering rest. Certain fig trees which served as
a place where the traveler rested, fleeing from the heat of the heat, shaded people, from
which came the name of the city. At that time it was the only way to the city of Viamão
and many travelers stopped in the shade of the trees to rest, hence the name of the city, only in 1820 the village that gave rise to Sombrio appeared.

See also
List of municipalities in Santa Catarina

References

Municipalities in Santa Catarina (state)